Tshobdun is a Rgyalrong language spoken in Sichuan, China. It is surrounded by the Zbu, Japhug, and Amdo Tibetan languages.

References

Further reading

 

Qiangic languages
Languages of China